Alex Paulo Menezes Santana (born 13 May 1995) is a Brazilian professional footballer who plays for Brasileirão Série A club Athletico Paranaense as a midfielder.

Santana began his professional career at Internacional in 2013, spending time on loan at Criciúma, Guarani and Paraná before moving to Botafogo six years later. He joined Athletico in July 2022.

Career

Early career
Santana began his professional career at Internacional. He made his debut on 11 October 2013 by replacing Otávio for the final 29 minutes in a 2–1 away loss against Flamengo.

Ludogorets
On 23 July 2020, Santana signed for Ludogorets Razgrad for a reported fee of €750,000. After signing a contract with the club, he said: "I joined Ludogorets to play in the Champions League.". He scored his debut goal for the Bulgarian champions on 23 August 2020 in a league game against Cherno More Varna. On 14 April 2021, he received his first red card in the 1:2 home loss against CSKA Sofia in a Bulgarian Cup match. During his time with Ludogorets, he established himself as a key member of the team.

Career statistics

References

External links

1995 births
Living people
Brazilian footballers
Association football midfielders
Campeonato Brasileiro Série A players
Campeonato Brasileiro Série B players
Campeonato Brasileiro Série C players
First Professional Football League (Bulgaria) players
Sport Club Internacional players
Criciúma Esporte Clube players
Guarani FC players
Paraná Clube players
Botafogo de Futebol e Regatas players
PFC Ludogorets Razgrad players
Club Athletico Paranaense players
Brazilian expatriate footballers
Expatriate footballers in Bulgaria